Lietuvos rytas (lit. 'Morning of Lithuania') is a Lithuanian daily newspaper.

History and profile
"Lietuvos rytas" was established in 1990 on a basis of newspaper "Komjaunimo tiesa". The paper is printed in Vilnius on Tuesday, Thursday and Saturday. It has a liberal political leaning. 
"Lietuvos rytas" is part of "Lietuvos rytas" media group.

Additionally to the daily newspaper come the supplements "Rytai-Vakarai", "Sostinė", "Laikinoji Sostinė", magazines "Stilius", "Savaitgalis" (with "TV Antena") and "Stilius Plius". The online version of the paper was started in 2005.

Its circulation was 55.700 copies in 2021.

References

External links
Lietuvos rytas online 

 
Newspapers published in Vilnius
Lithuanian-language newspapers
1990 establishments in Lithuania
Publications established in 1990
Daily newspapers published in Lithuania